The Kachin State Cultural Museum is a museum that display figures of Kachin national races and their traditional dresses, traditional looms & textile patterns, silverware & jewellery, household utensils, musical instruments, weapons and models of houses lived in by Kachin people. It is located at No 3, Yongyi Road and Thakhin Nat Pe Road, Myitkyina, Kachin State.

It was established on November 6, 1994. Admission fees are 2 US $ and opening hours are from 10:00 am to 3:30 pm (from Tuesday to Sunday).

References

Museums in Myanmar
Kachin State
Kachin people
Museums established in 1994
1994 establishments in Myanmar